Armando Sardi (born 15 September 1940) is an Italian former sprinter who competed in the 1960 Summer Olympics.

Olympic results

National titles
In the Livio Berruti's Era, Armando Sardi has won just one time the individual national championship.
1 win in the 200 metres (1963)

See also
 Italy national relay team

References

External links
 
 

1940 births
Living people
Sportspeople from Monza
Italian male sprinters
Olympic athletes of Italy
Athletes (track and field) at the 1960 Summer Olympics
Mediterranean Games gold medalists for Italy
Mediterranean Games silver medalists for Italy
Athletes (track and field) at the 1963 Mediterranean Games
Mediterranean Games medalists in athletics
Italian Athletics Championships winners
20th-century Italian people